Robert Jack Duarte Wallace (born April 7, 1986, in Mexico City, Mexico) is a Mexican actor and singer. He is known for his acting performance in the Mexican telenovela Rebelde as "Tomas Goycolea" and as a member of the Mexican-Argentine pop band, Eme 15.

Life

During his time in the boy band M5,  Duarte toured through various countries in Latin America including Bolivia, Peru, Ecuador, El Salvador, Costa Rica, Guatemala, and Honduras. Within  five years, M5s records twice achieved platinum status in Bolivia and once in Costa Rica. Duarte was a member of the musical group, Eme 15 from 2011 until the group's separation in December 2014. 

He acts in the television series, Miss XV.

Filmography

Rebelde (2004) as Tomás Goycolea
Velo de Novia (2003) as a member of M5'
 Miss XV (2012) as Eddy

References

External links

1986 births
Living people
Mexican male telenovela actors
Mexican male television actors
Mexican people of Basque descent
Male actors from Mexico City
Eme 15 members
Singers from Mexico City